The Angles were one of the main Germanic peoples who settled in Great Britain in the post-Roman period. They founded several kingdoms of the Heptarchy in Anglo-Saxon England. Their name is the root of the name England ("land of Ængle"). According to Tacitus, writing around 100 AD, a people known as Angles (Anglii) lived east of the Lombards and Semnones, who lived near the Elbe river.

Etymology

The name of the Angles may have been first recorded in Latinised form, as Anglii, in the Germania of Tacitus. It is thought to derive from the name of the area they originally inhabited, the Anglia Peninsula (Angeln in modern German, Angel in modern Danish).

Multiple theories concerning the etymology of the name have been hypothesised: 

 According to Gesta Danorum Dan and Angul (Angel) were made rulers by the consent of their people because of their bravery. Dan gave name to Danes and Angel gave names to Angles.
 It originated from the Germanic root for "narrow" (compare German and Dutch eng = "narrow"), meaning "the Narrow [Water]", i.e., the Schlei estuary; the root would be *h₂enǵʰ, "tight". 
 The name derives from "hook" (as in angling for fish), in reference to the shape of the peninsula; Indo-European linguist Julius Pokorny derives it from Proto-Indo-European *h₂enk-, "bend" (see ankle). Alternatively, the Angles may have been called such because they were a fishing people or were originally descended from such.

During the fifth century, all Germanic tribes who invaded Britain were referred to as either Englisc, Ængle or Engle, who were all speakers of Old English (which was known as Englisc, Ænglisc, or Anglisc). Englisc and its descendant, English, also goes back to Proto-Indo-European *h₂enǵʰ-, meaning narrow.

Pope Gregory I, in an epistle, simplified the Latinised name Anglii to Angli, the latter form developing into the preferred form of the word. The country remained Anglia in Latin. Alfred the Great's translation of Orosius's history of the world uses Angelcynn (-kin) to describe the English people; Bede uses Angelfolc (-folk); also such forms as Engel, Englan (the people), Englaland, and Englisc occur, all showing i-mutation.

Greco-Roman historiography

Tacitus

The earliest known mention of the Angles may be in chapter 40 of Tacitus's Germania written around AD 98. Tacitus describes the "Anglii" as one of the more remote Suebic tribes compared to the Semnones and Langobardi, who lived on the Elbe and were better known to the Romans. He grouped the Angles with several other tribes in that region, the Reudigni, Aviones, Varini, Eudoses, Suarines, and Nuithones. These were all living behind ramparts of rivers and woods, and therefore inaccessible to attack.

He gives no precise indication of their geographical situation but states that, together with the six other tribes, they worshipped Nerthus, or Mother Earth, whose sanctuary was located on "an island in the Ocean". The Eudoses are the Jutes; these names probably refer to localities in Jutland or on the Baltic coast. The coast contains sufficient estuaries, inlets, rivers, islands, swamps, and marshes to have been then inaccessible to those not familiar with the terrain, such as the Romans, who considered it unknown, inaccessible, with a small population and of little economic interest.

The majority of scholars believe that the Anglii lived on the coasts of the Baltic Sea, probably in the southern part of the Jutland peninsula. This view is based partly on Old English and Danish traditions regarding persons and events of the fourth century, and partly because striking affinities to the cult of Nerthus as described by Tacitus are to be found in pre-Christian Scandinavian religion.

Ptolemy
Ptolemy, writing in around AD 150, in his atlas Geography (2.10), describes them in a confusing manner. In one passage, the Sueboi Angeilloi (in Greek equivalent to Latin spelling Suevi Angili), are living in a stretch of land between the northern Rhine and central Elbe, but apparently not touching either river, with the Suebic Langobardi on the Rhine to their west, and the Suebic Semnones on the Elbe stretching to their east. This is unexpected. However, as pointed out by Gudmund Schütte, the Langobards also appear as the "Laccobardi" in another position near the Elbe and the Saxons, which is considered more likely to be correct, and the Angles probably lived in that region also. Owing to the uncertainty of this passage, much speculation existed regarding the original home of the Anglii.

One theory is that they or part of them dwelt or moved among other coastal people, perhaps confederated up to the basin of the Saale (in the neighbourhood of the ancient canton of Engilin) on the Unstrut valleys below the Kyffhäuserkreis, from which region the Lex Anglorum et Werinorum hoc est Thuringorum is believed by many to have come. The ethnic names of Frisians and Warines are also attested in these Saxon districts.

A second possible solution is that these Angles of Ptolemy are not those of Schleswig at all. According to Julius Pokorny, the Angri- in Angrivarii, the -angr in Hardanger and the Angl- in Anglii all come from the same root meaning "bend", but in different senses. In other words, the similarity of the names is strictly coincidental and does not reflect any ethnic unity beyond Germanic. Gudmund Schütte, in his analysis of Ptolemy, believes that the Angles have simply been moved by an error coming from Ptolemy's use of imperfect sources. He points out that Angles are placed correctly just to the northeast of the Langobardi, but that these have been duplicated, so that they appear once, correctly, on the lower Elbe, and a second time, incorrectly, at the northern Rhine.

Medieval historiography

Bede states that the Anglii, before coming to Great Britain, dwelt in a land called Angulus, "which lies between the province of the Jutes and the Saxons, and remains unpopulated to this day." Similar evidence is given by the Historia Brittonum. King Alfred the Great and the chronicler Æthelweard identified this place with Anglia, in the province of Schleswig (Slesvig; though it may then have been of greater extent), and this identification agrees with the indications given by Bede.

In the Norwegian seafarer Ohthere of Hålogaland's account of a two-day voyage from the Oslo fjord to Schleswig, he reported the lands on his starboard bow, and Alfred appended the note "on these islands dwelt the Engle before they came hither". Confirmation is afforded by English and Danish traditions relating to two kings named Wermund and Offa of Angel, from whom the Mercian royal family claimed descent and whose exploits are connected with Anglia, Schleswig, and Rendsburg.

Danish tradition has preserved record of two governors of Schleswig, father and son, in their service, Frowinus (Freawine) and Wigo (Wig), from whom the royal family of Wessex claimed descent. During the fifth century, the Anglii invaded Great Britain, after which time their name does not recur on the continent except in the title of the legal code issued to the Thuringians: Lex Angliorum et Werinorum hoc est Thuringorum.

The Angles are the subject of a legend about Pope Gregory I, who happened to see a group of Angle children from Deira for sale as slaves in the Roman market. As the story was told by Bede, Gregory was struck by the unusual appearance of the slaves and asked about their background. When told they were called Anglii (Angles), he replied with a Latin pun that translates well into English: "Bene, nam et angelicam habent faciem, et tales angelorum in caelis decet esse coheredes" (It is well, for they have an angelic face, and such people ought to be co-heirs of the angels in heaven). Supposedly, this encounter inspired the pope to launch a mission to bring Christianity to their countrymen.

Archaeology
The province of Schleswig has proved rich in prehistoric antiquities that date apparently from the fourth and fifth centuries. A large cremation cemetery has been found at Borgstedt, between Rendsburg and Eckernförde, and it has yielded many urns and brooches closely resembling those found in pagan graves in England. Of still greater importance are the great deposits at Thorsberg moor (in Anglia) and Nydam, which contained large quantities of arms, ornaments, articles of clothing, agricultural implements, etc., and in Nydam, even ships. By the help of these discoveries, Angle culture in the age preceding the invasion of Britannia can be pieced together.

Anglian kingdoms in England

According to sources such as the History of Bede, after the invasion of Britannia, the Angles split up and founded the kingdoms of Northumbria, East Anglia, and Mercia. H. R. Loyn has observed in this context that "a sea voyage is perilous to tribal institutions", and the apparently tribe-based kingdoms were formed in England. Early times had two northern kingdoms (Bernicia and Deira) and two midland ones (Middle Anglia and Mercia), which had by the seventh century resolved themselves into two Angle kingdoms, viz., Northumbria and Mercia. 

Northumbria held suzerainty amidst the Teutonic presence in the British Isles in the 7th century, but was eclipsed by the rise of Mercia in the 8th century. Both kingdoms fell in the great assaults of the Danish Viking armies in the 9th century. Their royal houses were effectively destroyed in the fighting, and their Angle populations came under the Danelaw. Further south, the Saxon kings of Wessex withstood the Danish assaults. Then in the late 9th and early 10th centuries, the kings of Wessex defeated the Danes and liberated the Angles from the Danelaw. 

They united their house in marriage with the surviving Angle royalty, and were accepted by the Angles as their kings. This marked the passing of the old Anglo-Saxon world and the dawn of the "English" as a new people. The regions of East Anglia and Northumbria are still known by their original titles. Northumbria once stretched as far north as what is now southeast Scotland, including Edinburgh, and as far south as the Humber estuary and even the river Witham.

The rest of that people stayed at the centre of the Angle homeland in the northeastern portion of the modern German Bundesland of Schleswig-Holstein, on the Jutland Peninsula. There, a small peninsular area is still called Anglia today and is formed as a triangle drawn roughly from modern Flensburg on the Flensburger Fjord to the City of Schleswig and then to Maasholm, on the Schlei inlet.

Notes

References

Sources
 
 
 
 
 
 
 
 

Attribution:
 

 
Early Germanic peoples
History of Northumberland
Ingaevones
Migration Period
Peoples of Anglo-Saxon England